Sergey Dmitrievich Miloradovich (– 4 February 1943) was a Russian painter of historical subjects.

Biography 
The son of a rural cleric, Miloradovich attended a divinity school in Moscow and served for 25 years as a sexton in the parish of the Gonchary Resurrection Church. In the early 1870s he became interested in painting and enrolled at the  Moscow School of Painting, Sculpture and Architecture where his teachers included such realist "itinerant" painters as Vasily Perov.

Miloradovich's paintings chronicle the history of the Russian Orthodox church with a special emphasis on the events of the 17th century, notably the Raskol. His works were shown at the major Peredvizhniki exhibitions from 1885 to 1923.

Miloradovich was awarded a bronze medal at the 1900 Exposition Universelle. He was named a fellow of the Imperial Academy of Arts nine years later.

After the October Revolution, Miloradovich's work was largely neglected. Little is known about his later years. He died in Moscow at the age of 91.

References

External links

1851 births
1943 deaths
People from Mozhaysky District, Moscow Oblast
People from Mozhaysky Uyezd
Russian Orthodox Christians from Russia
Russian male painters
19th-century painters of historical subjects
19th-century painters from the Russian Empire
20th-century Russian painters
19th-century male artists from the Russian Empire
20th-century Russian male artists
Moscow School of Painting, Sculpture and Architecture alumni